Byzantine Macedonia may refer to:

 Byzantine period in the history of medieval Macedonia (region)
 Macedonia (theme), a distinctive administrative unit of the Byzantine Empire

See also
 Macedonia (disambiguation)
 Ottoman Macedonia (disambiguation)
 Eastern Macedonia (disambiguation)
 Western Macedonia (disambiguation)
 North Macedonia (disambiguation)